The Nzhelele River is a major watercourse in Limpopo Province, South Africa. The river's catchment area comprises 2,436 square kilometers.

Course
This river collects much of the drainage of the northern slopes of the extensive rock formation of the Soutpansberg. Leaving the mountainous area, it meanders in a northeastward direction across the Lowveld, a wide plain that contains considerable biodiversity, including numerous large mammals such as giraffes, white rhinos and blue wildebeests. It joins the right bank of the Limpopo River 33 km east of Musina.

The Mutamba River, its main tributary, rises in the Buelgum Poort farm of the Soutpansberg, further west from the sources of the Nzhelele. Other tributaries are the Tshiruru River, Mugungudi River, Mutshedzi River and the Wyllie River.

Dams in the basin
Nzhelele Dam
Mutshedzi Dam, in the Mutshedzi River

See also
Drainage basin A
Limpopo Water Management Area
 List of rivers of South Africa

References

External links
Sites - Important Bird Areas (IBAs) - Soutpansberg
Limpopo WMA1
Aventura Tshipise Resort & Restaurant

Rivers of Limpopo
Tributaries of the Limpopo River